Journal of an Urban Robinson Crusoe: London and Brighton is a book written by Des Marshall. It is a portrait of a troubled yet resilient and compassionate man and the people he meets in London and Brighton in the closing years of the twentieth century.

Taking the form of a journal, it is mostly based on Des Marshall's own experiences and covers a six-year period between 1995 and 2001. It was first published by Saxon Books in 2002.

In 2009 it was adapted into a play called The Urban Robinson Crusoe.

External links
 Details about the book

2002 non-fiction books
British biographies